Al-Hindiya or Hindiya is a city in Iraq on the Euphrates River. Al-Hindiya is located in the Karbala Governorate and is the seat of Al-Hindiya District. The city used to be known as Tuwairij, which gives name to the "Tuwairij run" that takes place here every year as part of the Mourning of Muharram on the Day of Ashura. It has 84,100 citizens.

History
The city was founded in 1793 AD by "Muhammad Yahya Asif Al-Dawla Bahadur Al-Hindi" ( محمّد يحيى آصف الدولة بهادر الهندي), who was the first Nawab of Awadh. He funded digging a canal on the Euphrates to provide drinkable water for the region.

Notable people
Nouri al Maliki went to school there in his younger days.

References

Hindiya
Hindiya
India–Iraq relations